Summer Forever is the sixth studio album by American country music singer Billy Currington. It was released on June 2, 2015 via Mercury Nashville. The album includes the number one singles "Don't It", "It Don't Hurt Like It Used To", and "Do I Make You Wanna". This is Currington's fifth consecutive album to contain at least two number one singles and his first album to have three singles at the top of the charts.

Content
In an interview with website Taste of Country, Currington stated: "Making this album was such a blast for me. I put a lot of love into this project and couldn’t be more excited for fans to hear the new music". He also added that "Summer Forever for [him] represents a positive, happy, good time lifestyle and that’s what [he] hope[s] the fans feel when they hear the record".
"Don't It" was released on October 27, 2014 as the album's lead off single. It peaked at number one on the Country Airplay chart dated June 6, 2015. The album's second single, "Drinkin' Town with a Football Problem", was released to radio on June 8, 2015. Despite a relatively high debut at number 41, the song fell to number 54 in its second week and struggled to climb the charts, ultimately peaking at number 30 in November 2015 and becoming Currington's lowest-charting single at the time, alongside "Tangled Up" from 2007.
"It Don't Hurt Like It Used To" was sent to country radio on February 8, 2016 as the album's third single. It reached number one on the Country Airplay chart in October 2016 and held the number one position for two consecutive weeks. "Do I Make You Wanna" is the album's fourth single, being served to radio in November 2016. It reached number one on the Country Airplay chart in August 2017, holding that position for three consecutive weeks. "Wake Me Up" served as the album's fifth and final single, releasing to country radio in September 2017.

Track listing

Personnel
Adapted from liner notes

J. Bonilla – programming on "Jonesin'"
Mike Brignardello – bass guitar
Tom Bukovac – electric guitar
Jessie James Decker – background vocals on "Good Night"
Paul Franklin – steel guitar
Jesse Frasure – programming on "It Don't Hurt Like It Used To" & "Summer Forever"
Kenny Greenberg – electric guitar
Dann Huff – electric guitar
David Huff – programming
Charlie Judge – keyboards
Chris McHugh – drums
Danny Rader – acoustic guitar
Jimmie Lee Sloas – bass guitar
Russell Terrell – background vocals
Ilya Toshinsky – acoustic guitar
Derek Wells – electric guitar

Chart performance
The album debuted on the Top Country Albums chart at number 3, and on the Billboard 200 at number 15, selling over 20,800 copies in the United States during its first week.  The album has sold 68,500 copies in the US as of October 2016.

Weekly charts

Year-end charts

Singles

Certifications

References

2015 albums
Billy Currington albums
Mercury Nashville albums
Albums produced by Dann Huff